Zuid-Waddinxveen is a former municipality in the Dutch province of South Holland. It covered the southern half of the village Waddinxveen.

The municipality existed between 1817 and 1870, when it merged with Noord-Waddinxveen.

References

Former municipalities of South Holland
Waddinxveen